Michael Ralph Paine (June 25, 1928 – March 1, 2018) was an American engineer. He became notable after the assassination of President John F. Kennedy, because he was an acquaintance of the President's assassin Lee Harvey Oswald. His wife, Ruth Hyde Paine, housed Lee's estranged wife, Marina Oswald, in her home for several months before the assassination until the day after it.

Early life
Paine was born in New York, New York. His father was Lyman Paine, an architect and activist. His mother was Ruth Forbes Young, financial backer of International Peace Academy and daughter of Elise Cabot Forbes, a scion of the Cabot family. He had one sibling, Cameron Paine.

Paine graduated from high school in New York in 1947. He attended Harvard University for two years in 1947-1949 and Swarthmore College for a year, but did not graduate.

Career
After serving in the U.S. Army, Paine worked a few months for Griswold Manufacturing Co. After that, Paine worked at the Bartol Research Foundation in Swarthmore, Pennsylvania for about a year. He then worked for his mother's third husband Arthur M. Young, making helicopter models in Pennsylvania.

In 1958, Paine became employed at Bell Helicopter through Young, his stepfather and designer of the first commercial helicopter, Bell 47.

Personal life
In 1957, he married Ruth Avery Hyde in Pennsylvania. They had two children: Lynn (b. 1959) and Christopher (b. 1961). In 1959, they relocated to 2525 West Fifth Street in Irving, Texas, a suburb of Dallas. when Paine began work at a Bell Helicopter facility in Fort Worth.  One issue is whether the Minox camera found in the Paine garage belonged to Lee Oswald or to Michael Paine.  Another issue is what activities Lee Oswald and Michael Paine had in common, given Michael Paine's statement to Frontline (Who Was Lee Harvey Oswald?, PBS) that he and Lee Oswald shared unspecified interests.

In late September 1962, Paine and his wife Ruth separated, Ruth asked him to have his personal belongings moved out of the house by the time she got back home from traveling around the United States that summer. According to Michael, it was not he, but Ruth who pushed to end legally their marriage. As their divorce made its way through the legal system until it ended in 1970, the Paines continued to see films at the theater together, and their Madrigal singing as a couple continued. Michael kept his own apartment in Arlington, Texas, while Ruth remained with Lynn and Christopher in the Irving home. In the end, the divorce was amicable, and Michael kept a very favorable view of Ruth.

On February 22, 1963, Ruth Paine attended a party held at the home of her fellow madrigal singer, Everett Glover, who knew that Ruth was learning to speak Russian and thought she might be interested in meeting a couple he knew, Marina and Lee Harvey Oswald.

Lee had defected to the USSR after serving in the Marine Corps, and Marina was Russian-born. They had recently returned to the United States with their young daughter, June.  Everett invited many of his engineer friends in Dallas to attend, including George de Mohrenschildt, Volkmar Schmidt, Michael Paine, and many others.  Everett thought they would all be interested in interviewing Lee Harvey Oswald.  He also thought that Ruth would enjoy practicing her Russian conversation skills with a native Russian speaker, Marina Oswald.

Michael Paine caught a cold that night, and didn't go, but Ruth Paine did go to the party, and met Marina Oswald for the first time.  Ruth started a close friendship with Marina that would last until the JFK Assassination.

Relationship with Lee Harvey Oswald

As April 1963 began, Ruth planned to cook dinner for the Oswalds at her home, and she asked Michael to pick them up and drive them to her house.  (The Oswalds had no car.)  Michael met the Oswalds for the first time on April 2, 1963. when he picked up Lee, Marina, and their baby daughter, June at their apartment at 214 West Neely Street in Dallas.  Before he drove them to Ruth's house, he had to endure a long wait as Marina got ready.

From the start (Michael told the Warren Commission) he took an immediate dislike toward Lee Oswald, who continually barked orders at his wife, Marina, from the living room, without lifting a finger to help her.  Lee's demeaning words directed at his wife offended Michael, who told author Thomas Mallon that he pitied Marina for "having to take these whiplashes meekly and quietly and obediently."

Michael neglected to tell the Warren Commission, however, that Lee Harvey Oswald had also used that time to speak with Michael about his fervent political views, and to proudly display to Michael a now-famous "backyard photograph."  This was one of four known photos of Lee holding his rifle, wearing his pistol, and displaying two Marxist newspapers. (The photo looked fake, but Lee Oswald was known to have made fake ID's at the printing shop in which he had been working around that time.)

On the contrary, Michael swore to the Warren Commission that he had 'no idea' that Lee Harvey Oswald ever had a rifle.  In 1993, however, Michael Paine told Gus Russo, author of 'Live by the Sword' (1998) that Lee Oswald showed him this famous Backyard Photograph at their first meeting on April 2, 1963.

Over the next seven months, Michael told the Warren Commission, he was continually upset by the fact that Lee Oswald refused to let Marina learn to read, speak, or write in English.

But Michael did not emphasize for the Warren Commission the several talks that he had with Lee Oswald about the radical right wing and resigned General Edwin Walker, who had been making trouble for JFK since October 1962.  All he knew was that he and Lee Oswald 'agreed' about General Walker.

The Warren Commission was far more interested in the fact that Lee Harvey Oswald lived in a rented room in Dallas, but stored most of his possessions in Paine's garage.  This is because Marina Oswald told Dallas Police that Lee Oswald kept an army rifle there, wrapped in a blanket.  Michael Paine told the Warren Commission that he always thought it was camping equipment.

Paine's wife helped Oswald get a job at the Texas School Book Depository. Paine's testimony would later become a central feature of the Warren Commission's investigation of the assassination, particularly in regard to the presence of the purported assassination rifle in the garage of his family home.

Paine and his wife were portrayed in Oliver Stone's JFK as characters called "Bill and Janet Williams," presumably to avoid legal action.

In 1964, Paine testified that he was a member of the American Civil Liberties Union.

The Santa Rosa Press Democrat reported that Paine died March 1, 2018, in Sebastopol, California.

References

1928 births
2018 deaths
Engineers from New York City
Harvard University alumni
People associated with the assassination of John F. Kennedy
Military personnel from New York City
Swarthmore College alumni